The three-click rule or three click rule is an unofficial web design rule concerning the design of website navigation.  It suggests that a user of a website should be able to find any information with no more than three mouse clicks.  It is based on the belief that users of a site will become frustrated and often leave if they cannot find the information within the three clicks.

Although there is little analytical evidence that this is the case, it is a commonly held belief amongst designers that the rule is part of a good system of navigation. Critics of the rule suggest that the number of clicks is not as important as the success of the clicks or information sent.

Jeffrey Zeldman wrote, in Taking Your Talent to the Web (2001),  that the Three-Click Rule is "based on the way people use the Web" and "the rule can help you create sites with intuitive, logical hierarchical structures".

Criticism 

The three click rule has been challenged by usability test results, which have shown that the number of clicks needed to access the desired information affects neither user satisfaction, nor success rate.

In eCommerce websites, the rule can often be detrimental as in order to adhere to the rule, products on offer to customers must be grouped into categories that are far too large to be easily browsed.

References 

Web design